Gomezgani Chirwa (born 25 September 1996) is a Malawian footballer who plays as a full-back for Nyasa Big Bullets and the Malawi national team. He was included in Malawi's squad for the 2021 Africa Cup of Nations.

References

External links

1996 births
Living people
Malawian footballers
Malawi international footballers
People from Dowa District
Association football fullbacks
Civo United FC players
Nyasa Big Bullets FC players
2021 Africa Cup of Nations players